Viviano is both a surname and a masculine given name. It may refer to:

 Viviano, Bishop of Pamplona until 1163
Benedict T. Viviano O.P. (born 1940), American scholar
David Viviano (born 1971), Michigan Supreme Court Justice
Emiliano Viviano (born 1985), Italian footballer
Frank Viviano (born 1947), American journalist
Sam Viviano (born 1953), American artist
Viviano Codazzi (c.1606–1670), Italian painter
Viviano Guida (born 1955), Italian footballer

Masculine given names